King City may refer to:

Places
 King City, Ontario, Canada, an unincorporated village in the township of King
 King City GO Station, a station in the GO Transit network located in the community
 King City Secondary School, one of three high schools in the community
 King City, California, USA, a city in Monterey County
 King City High School, a high school in the city
 King City Township, McPherson County, Kansas, a civil township
 King City, Missouri, USA, a city in Gentry County
 King City, Oregon, USA, a city in Washington County

Arts, entertainment, and media

Music
 King City (band), a band included on 2007's Unlimited Sunshine Tour
 "King City" (song), the debut single of the band Swim Deep
 "King City", a song from Andre Nickatina 2005 album The Gift 
"King City", 2016 song by Majid Jordan on the album Majid Jordan

Other arts, entertainment, and media
 King City (comic), a comic by Brandon Graham
 King City, a fictional location in the Eight Worlds novels

Others
 King City (naval vessel), British naval collier sunk in the Indian Ocean by the German auxiliary cruiser Atlantis in August 1940

See also
 Kings City, an Israeli theme park
 King's City, a historical nickname for a number of cities, including Alghero, Drohobych, and Rokycany
Queen City (disambiguation)